Dalbergia junghuhnii (synonym D. curtisii) is a species of shrub placed in the subfamily Faboideae and tribe Dalbergieae; no subspecies are listed in the Catalogue of Life.

D. junghuhnii has a native range from Indochina to Malesia; the Vietnamese name (as its synonym D. curtisii) is ni rinh or trắc Curtis.

References

External links

 
Flora of Indo-China
Flora of Malesia